The Hongping Pumped Storage Power Station is a 1,200 MW pumped-storage hydroelectric power station located at about  northwest of Hongping in Jing'an County of Jiangxi Province, China. It was the first pumped-storage hydroelectric power station constructed in Jiangxi.

It is operated by Jiangxi Hongping Pumped Storage Ltd.

Construction
The project was split into two phases, with first phase resulting in 1,200MW of installed capacity. Construction on the project's first phase began in June 2010. The first generator was commissioned in June 2014 and by December 2016, all the four 300MW generators were commissioned, marking the end of the first phase.

In 2021, a feasibility study on the second phase of the project was begun. The study completed in November 2022 and the second phase project, which plans to add an additional total capacity of 1,800 MW to the power station, was deemed feasible.  When fully operational, the power station will have an installed capacity of 3,000 MW.

Reservoirs
The power station contains four 300 MW Francis pump turbines.

See also

List of pumped-storage power stations

References

Dams in China
Gravity dams
Pumped-storage hydroelectric power stations in China
Buildings and structures under construction in China
Hydroelectric power stations in Jiangxi
Dams completed in 2014
Roller-compacted concrete dams
Underground power stations
2014 establishments in China
Dams under construction in China